XHPNOC-FM is a radio station on 96.5 FM in Asunción Nochixtlán, Oaxaca, known as Hits 96.5 FM.

History
XHPNOC was awarded in the IFT-4 radio auction of 2017. The station began operations in February 2019.

References

Radio stations in Oaxaca
Radio stations established in 2019
2019 establishments in Mexico